The 2009–10 Atlantic 10 Conference men's basketball season marks the 34th season of Atlantic 10 Conference basketball.

Preseason
In the preseason, talk centered around the University of Dayton, who returned four starters from a 27–8 team that advanced to the second round of the 2009 NCAA tournament.  Dayton forward Chris Wright was named to the John R. Wooden Award preseason top 50 candidate list on August 19, the only Atlantic 10 player so honored.  Wright also was named to the Naismith Award watch list on October 29.  In other preseason recognition, Jason Duty of Duquesne and Yves Mekongo of La Salle were named to the 30-man preseason candidate list for the Lowe's Senior CLASS Award.

In a vote of league coaches and media, Dayton was named the preseason favorite to win the league.  Dayton also received national recognition as the Flyers were ranked in both preseason polls – #21 in the AP Poll and #22 in the ESPN/USA Today Coaches' poll.

Atlantic 10 Preseason Poll

Preseason All-A10 Team
First Team
 Lavoy Allen, Temple
 Kevin Anderson, Richmond
 Rodney Green, La Salle
 Ricky Harris, Massachusetts
 Chris Wright, Dayton

Second Team
 David Gonzalvez, Richmond
 DiJuan Harris, Charlotte
 Andrew Nicholson, St. Bonaventure
 Marcus Johnson, Dayton
 Damian Saunders, Duquesne

Third Team
 Bill Clark, Duquesne
 Keith Cothran, Rhode Island
 Jordan Crawford, Xavier
 Dan Geriot, Richmond
 Kwamain Mitchell, Saint Louis

Preseason A10 All-Defensive Team
 Dante’ Jackson, Xavier
 Jason Love, Xavier
 Andrew Nicholson, St. Bonaventure
 London Warren, Dayton
 Garrett Williamson, Saint Joseph’s

Preseason A10 All-Rookie Team
 Shamarr Bowden, Charlotte
 Chris Gaston, Fordham
 Aaric Murray, La Salle
 Freddie Riley, Massachusetts
 Terrell Vinson, Massachusetts

Regular season

Postseason

Atlantic 10 tournament

Beginning this season, the Atlantic 10 men's basketball tournament changed formats so that first-round games would be played on the home court of the higher-seeded team, then the tournament would move to Boardwalk Hall in Atlantic City.  In 2009, all rounds were held at the same site.

Conference awards & honors

Weekly awards
Atlantic 10 Players of the Week
Throughout the conference season, the Atlantic 10 offices name a player and rookie of the week.

All-Conference Awards
 Player of the Year: Kevin Anderson, Richmond
 Rookie of the Year: Chris Gaston, Fordham
 Defensive Player of the Year: Damian Saunders, Duquesne
 Chris Daniels Most Improved Player of the Year: Chris Johnson, Dayton
 Sixth Man of the Year: Ramone Moore, Temple
 Student-Athlete of the Year: Yves Mekongo, La Salle
 Coach of the Year: Fran Dunphy, Temple

Atlantic 10 Men's Basketball All-Conference Teams
First Team
 Kevin Anderson, Richmond
 Lavoy Allen, Temple
 Jordan Crawford, Xavier
 Damian Saunders, Duquesne
 Chris Wright, Dayton

Second Team
 Ryan Brooks, Temple
 David Gonzalvez, Richmond
 Rodney Green, La Salle
 Kwamain Mitchell, Saint Louis
 Andrew Nicholson, St. Bonaventure

Third Team
 Keith Cothran, Rhode Island
 Ricky Harris, Massachusetts
 Delroy James, Rhode Island
 Jason Love, Xavier
 Shamari Spears, Charlotte

Honorable Mention
 Juan Fernandez, Temple
 Damian Hollis, George Washington
 Willie Reed, Saint Louis

Rookie Team
 Chris Braswell, Charlotte
 Cody Ellis, Saint Louis
 Chris Gaston, Fordham
 Lasan Kromah, George Washington
 Aaric Murray, La Salle
 Akeem Richmond, Rhode Island

Defensive Team
 Lavoy Allen, Temple
 David Gonzalvez, Richmond
 Damian Saunders, Duquesne
 London Warren, Dayton
 Garrett Williamson, Saint Joseph’s

Academic Team
 Brian Conklin, Saint Louis
 Jason Duty, Duquesne
 Kurt Huelsman, Dayton
 Will Martell, Rhode Island
 Yves Mekongo, La Salle

Rankings

References

External links
 Atlantic 10 Official website
 2009–10 Atlantic 10 Men's Basketball Prospectus